Diaparsis is a genus of parasitoid wasps belonging to the family Ichneumonidae.

The genus has cosmopolitan distribution.

Species:
 Diaparsis abstata Khalaim, 2013
 Diaparsis americana (Brues, 1916)

References

Ichneumonidae
Ichneumonidae genera